Khorramdasht is a city in Qazvin Province, Iran.

Khorramdasht or Khorram Dasht may also refer to various places in Iran:
 Khorram Dasht, Kashan, Isfahan Province
 Khorramdasht, Nain, Isfahan Province
 Khorramdasht District, in Qazvin Province
 Khorram Dasht Rural District (disambiguation)